Kevin Morris (born July 17, 1963) is an American lawyer, producer, and writer.

Education 
Morris graduated from Cornell University in 1985 with a B.A. in Government and spent a semester at the London School of Economics. He attended law school at New York University, where he received a J.D. in 1988.

Career 
Morris is the founder and managing partner of the Morris Yorn Entertainment Law Firm, which represents major American media figures such as Trey Parker and Matt Stone, Matthew McConaughey, Mike Judge, Ellen DeGeneres, Scarlett Johansson, Zoe Saldana, Liam Hemsworth, Zach Galifianakis, Chris Rock, and Laura Linney.
He produced the 1997 documentary film Hands on a Hard Body, and co-produced the Broadway musical The Book of Mormon for which he won a Tony Award. He is also known for brokering the TV show South Park. 

His articles on media and entertainment have appeared in The Wall Street Journal, Los Angeles Times and Filmmaker Magazine. His first collection of short stories, White Man's Problems, was released by Grove Atlantic's Black Cat imprint in January 2015, while his first novel, All Joe Knight, was published by Grove Atlantic in December 2016.

Personal life 
Morris grew up in the suburbs of Philadelphia as the son of a refinery worker and a school secretary. At Cornell, he played for the junior varsity basketball team as a walk-on, was president of the Sigma Pi fraternity chapter, and a Cornell Tradition Scholar.  After graduating from law school at NYU, Morris moved to LA where he began his career in entertainment law by handling the contracts of independent filmmakers before founding Morris Yorn Barnes & Levine in 1995.
He currently resides in Los Angeles.
He is a member of the board of directors of the jklivin foundation and has been a member of the Cornell University Council since 2011.

The New York Times reported in May 2022 that Morris met Hunter Biden at a December 2019 fundraiser for the presidential campaign of Biden's father, Joe Biden. The younger Biden was at the time under federal criminal investigation for his tax matters and dealing with personal struggles. Morris became a confidant to Hunter Biden, lending him more than $2 million to cover family expenses and pay back taxes.

Writing 
Morris has written articles on media and entertainment for The Wall Street Journal, the Los Angeles Times,
Filmmaker Magazine, and The Jerusalem Post.
He has also written reviews and criticism for The Huffington Post.
In 2014, he published White Man's Problems, a collection of short stories. Kirkus Reviews called it a "mordantly funny take on a modern predicament".
In 2016, Morris published a novel, All Joe Knight, which was long-listed for the Center for Fiction First Novel Prize, and named as the Amazon Best Book of the Month in Literature and Fiction for December 2016. USA Today called it "a two-fisted debut novel," while Esquire called it "a remarkable and agonizing portrayal of a middle-aged man who doesn't know what's become of his life, and doesn't seem to care."

References

External links 
 
 Kevin Morris Official Website: “The Author” kevinmorrisauthor.com, Los Angeles, 2014. Retrieved May 30, 2014.
 "Rewriting Hollywood’s Rules", The New York Times, September 10, 2007.
 "The Barnes Morris Partners (Michael Barnes, Kevin Morris, Debbie Klein, Douglas Mark, Kevin Yorn, Stephen Barnes and Jared Levine)", Variety, Los Angeles, March 28, 2007. Retrieved June 3, 2014.
 Cornell Alumni Magazine

1963 births
Living people
Cornell University alumni
American entertainment lawyers
American male writers
New York University School of Law alumni